Liskeard West and Dobwalls is an electoral division of Cornwall in the United Kingdom and returns one member to sit on Cornwall Council. The current Councillor is Jane Pascoe, a Conservative.

Extent
Liskeard West and Dobwalls covers the west of Liskeard, including the suburb of Moorswater, and the village of Dobwalls. The division covers 655 hectares in total.

Election results

2017 election

2013 election

References

Liskeard
Electoral divisions of Cornwall Council